Mohelno is a market town in Třebíč District in the Vysočina Region of the Czech Republic. It has about 1,300 inhabitants.

Notable people
Josef Neruda (1807–1875), organist and music teacher

References

Populated places in Třebíč District
Market towns in the Czech Republic